Aswad Kwame Leon Thomas (born 9 August 1989 in London) is an former English professional footballer who played as a left-back.

Having started his career with Charlton Athletic; he spent time on loan with Accrington Stanley, Barnet and Lewes before signing for Woking in 2009, and Braintree Town in 2011. He played for Grimsby Town for two and a half years and had a second short stint with Woking before joining Dover Athletic in 2015.

Career

Charlton Athletic
Thomas started his career with the Charlton Athletic youth system. Although he never made his senior debut, Thomas appeared on the bench twice, but he did make four appearances for the U18s and featured 11 times for the reserves in the 2007–08 season, scoring in the 8–4 home victory over Southampton in September 2007. Thomas had been compared to former Charlton hero Richard Rufus, and noted as a clean striker of a ball, athletic and strong in the tackle.

He joined Accrington Stanley on loan in January 2008 where he made his Football League debut against Wycombe Wanderers. He scored twice in a 2–3 victory against Chester City, firing in Leam Richardson's defence-splitting pass and Thomas followed up John Danby's parry from his own shot to level. He returned to Charlton after serving his suspension for being sent off against Macclesfield Town when he had thrown the ball in the face of Shaun Brisley. He also played twice on loan at Barnet at the start of the 2008–09 season, after completing his month-long loan with League Two side Barnet, shortly afterwards he joined Lewes on loan.

Woking
He signed a one-year contract with Conference South outfit Woking in 2009 and scored on his debut against Welling United which Woking went on to win 2–1.

Braintree Town
In June 2011, Thomas signed for the newly promoted Conference National team Braintree Town. After playing five games with three clean sheets, Thomas received his first of seven yellow cards on 29 August 2011 in the 50th minute, in the 2–3 defeat against Ebbsfleet United. He scored his first of five goals in the 2011–12 season, a close range shot into the bottom right corner in the 6–2 defeat at York City. Three games later he scored in the 5–4 defeat against Kidderminster Harriers.

England C manager Paul Fairclough confirmed that Thomas had been close to getting an international call-up, and on 10 November 2011 Aswad Thomas was included in the stand-by contingency squad for the England C team in the friendly against Gibraltar on the following Tuesday. On 26 November 2011 Thomas received his 2nd yellow card of the season in the 10th minute for unsporting behaviour and was sent off in the 85th minute for his second bookable offence, an unfair foul on Curtis Obeng, serving a one match ban after the 0–0 stalemate against Wrexham. On 26 December 2011 he received his 3rd yellow card in 78th minute for a foul on substitute defender Jonathon Thorpe in the 2–0 away defeat at Cambridge United. Thomas scored his 5th and final goal for Braintree

At the start of the new calendar year and in the following game on New Year's Day, again Thomas fouled Jonathon Thorpe to receive his 4th yellow card in the 19th minute in the 3–2 victory at home against Cambridge United. His third goal of the season came when he scored the opening goal, Thomas volleyed in Ben Wright's cross in the 2–2 draw at home against Stockport County. He scored a crucial 79th-minute goal in the 1–0 home win against Barrow, a low pass from defender Dean Wells to Thomas, he scored inside the six-yard box to the bottom right corner of the goal. On 18 February 2012 he received his 5th yellow card in the 1–0 away defeat at A.F.C. Telford United for unsporting behaviour, after giving away a free kick for an unfair challenge on striker Chris Sharp. On 17 March 2012 Thomas received his 6th yellow card in the 1–4 defeat at home to Kidderminster for unsporting behaviour, after conceding a free kick for a foul on defender Lee Vaughan. On 24 March 2012 Thomas scored the opening goal in the 0–4 thrashing of Barrow, latching onto striker Sean Marks' header from 18 yards at the edge of the penalty box to the top left corner of the goal.

On 14 April 2012 Thomas was forced to sit on the bench despite not being 100 per cent fit at Stockport County and missed the following home game against York City also due to the knee injury. Having missed the previous two games, Thomas played in what became his last and final game of the season for Braintree in the 5–1 defeat at Wrexham.

Grimsby Town
Thomas signed a two-year deal with Conference National side Grimsby Town on 4 July 2012, for an undisclosed fee, thought to be around £15,000.

Having impressed in his first five games for Grimsby, Thomas was named in the England C squad to face Belgium in Brussels on Wednesday 12 September in an International Challenge Trophy game.

In his first two seasons with Grimsby, Thomas was a runner-up in the 2013 FA Trophy as well as losing in the Conference Premier semi-final in both years. On 4 January 2014 he scored a last minute own goal which meant Grimsby were dumped out of the FA Cup third round in a 2–3 defeat against Huddersfield Town. On 22 January 2015, Thomas was signed off from work with the club after suffering from stress. Thomas had requested the cancellation of his contract in order to resolve personal issues and sort out a transfer away from the club, however Grimsby decided in this case to allow the player a month's leave. On 3 February Thomas was released by Grimsby on mutual consent.

Return to Woking
Shortly after being given a month's leave by Grimsby, it was confirmed by Conference Premier side Woking that Thomas had returned to the club and had signed contractual forms for the rest of the season.

Dover Athletic
On 28 August 2015, following his release from Woking, Thomas joined Dover Athletic on a one-year deal.

Sutton United
Thomas joined Sutton United in the 2017 close season alongside former Dover teammates Ross Lafayette and Moses Emmanuel. He made his club debut on 5 August 2017 in a 2–0 home victory over Leyton Orient. He scored his first goal for the club on 23 September in a 3–2 win against Barrow.

Personal Life
After retiring from football, Thomas is now a Caribbean chef and set up Dreadz Kitchen which is offering Carribbean meals to his local community in London from his own kitchen.

International career
Thomas was called up to the England C team in 2012.

Career statistics

Honours

Club
Grimsby Town
Lincolnshire Senior Cup Winners (1): 2012–13
FA Trophy : Runners-up, 2012–13

Individual
Braintree Supporters Player of The Season: 2011–12
 Conference National Team of the Year: 2012–13

References

External links
Aswad Thomas player profile at cafc.co.uk

 (at Lewes)

Living people
1989 births
English footballers
Charlton Athletic F.C. players
Accrington Stanley F.C. players
Barnet F.C. players
Lewes F.C. players
Woking F.C. players
Braintree Town F.C. players
Grimsby Town F.C. players
Dover Athletic F.C. players
Sutton United F.C. players
English Football League players
National League (English football) players
England semi-pro international footballers
Association football fullbacks